The 2017 Poprad-Tatry ATP Challenger Tour was a professional tennis tournament played on clay courts. It was the third edition of the tournament which was part of the 2017 ATP Challenger Tour. It took place in Poprad, Slovakia between 19 and 24 June 2017.

Singles main-draw entrants

Seeds

 1 Rankings are as of 12 June 2017.

Other entrants
The following players received wildcards into the singles main draw:
  Martin Kližan
  Alex Molčan
  Dominik Šproch
  Péter Vajda

The following players received entry from the qualifying draw:
  Nikola Čačić
  Filip Horanský
  Luca Margaroli
  Dennis Novak

Champions

Singles

  Cedrik-Marcel Stebe def.  Laslo Đere 6–0, 6–3.

Doubles

  Mateusz Kowalczyk /  Andreas Mies def.  Luca Margaroli /  Tristan-Samuel Weissborn 6–3, 7–6(7–3).

External links
 Website (Slovak)

Poprad-Tatry ATP Challenger Tour
Poprad-Tatry ATP Challenger Tour
Pop
June 2017 sports events in Europe